Doug Singh is a Belizean politician and a member of the United Democratic Party. He is the former Minister of Police and Public Security in Prime Minister Dean Barrow's cabinet 2010.

Personal life
Singh's father George Singh was a Justice of the Supreme Court of Belize, who served briefly as Chief Justice in 1998. He has two brothers and two sisters and is of Punjabi Sikh heritage.

References 

Year of birth missing (living people)
Living people
Belizean businesspeople
Belizean people of Indian descent
Government ministers of Belize
United Democratic Party (Belize) politicians